Balat is a town in the Indian state of Meghalaya. It is one of the designated India-Bangladesh Border Haat.

Climate

The climate here is tropical. During most months of the year, there is significant rainfall in Balat. There is only a short dry season. This climate is considered to be Am according to the Köppen-Geiger climate classification. The temperature here averages 24.7 °C. The rainfall here averages 3444 mm. The driest month is December, with 6 mm of rain. Most precipitation falls in June, with an average of 740 mm

See also 

 Bangladesh–India border
 Borders of India
 Border ceremonies of India's with neighbours
 Foreign trade of India
 BIMSTEC
 SAARC

References

Bangladesh–India relations
Bangladesh–India border
Cities and towns in West Khasi Hills district